Gijali-ye Pain (also Romanized as Gījālī-ye Pā’īn; also known as Gījālī-ye Soflá) is a village in Valanjerd Rural District, in the Central District of Borujerd County, Lorestan Province, Iran. At the 2006 census, its population was 416, in 108 families.

References 

Towns and villages in Borujerd County